Carl-Johan Forssén Ehrlin is a Swedish author of the bestselling children's book The Rabbit Who Wants to Fall Asleep, written to help parents get their children to fall asleep. Forssén Ehrlin has a background in psychology which helped him while writing the book. The Rabbit Who Wants to Fall Asleep has topped Amazon's best seller list.

References

External links
 Official website

Swedish male writers
Year of birth missing (living people)
Living people